Stephanie Peacock (born July 8, 1992) is an American swimmer specializing in distance freestyle and open water swimming.  She won a bronze medal in the 10k Open water and a gold medal in the 1500m at the 2013 World University Games.  She swam at the University of North Carolina at Chapel Hill. In 2016, she was ranked eighth in the world in the 800m. In 2016, she was ranked 4th in the US in the 800m.

References

1992 births
Living people
American female swimmers
Universiade medalists in swimming
Universiade gold medalists for the United States
Universiade silver medalists for the United States
Universiade bronze medalists for the United States
Medalists at the 2013 Summer Universiade
Medalists at the 2011 Summer Universiade
Medalists at the 2015 Summer Universiade
21st-century American women
People from Cape Coral, Florida
Swimmers from Florida
Sportspeople from Miami
North Carolina Tar Heels women's swimmers